This is a list of public holidays in Martinique.

In addition, private sector often take these holidays (jour chômé d'usage in France) which are not official holidays.

References

Martinique
Martinican culture
Martinique
Martinique